This is a list of public aquariums in Canada. For zoos in Canada, see List of zoos in Canada.

Aquariums are facilities where animals are confined within tanks and displayed to the public, and in which they may also be bred. Such facilities include public aquariums, oceanariums, marine mammal parks, and dolphinariums.

Alberta
 Sea Life Caverns - Edmonton

British Columbia
 Pacific Undersea Gardens (operated from 1964-2013) - Victoria
 Sealand of the Pacific (operated from 1969-1992) - Victoria
 Ucluelet Aquarium - Ucluelet
 Vancouver Aquarium - Vancouver
 Shaw Centre for the Salish Sea - Sidney
 Discovery Passage Aquarium  - Campbell River
 Alberni Aquarium and Stewardship Centre  - Port Alberni
 Nicholas Sonntag Marine Education Centre - Gibsons, British Columbia

Ontario
 Marineland of Canada - Niagara Falls
 Ripley's Aquarium of Canada - Toronto

Quebec
 Aquarium du Québec - Sainte-Foy, Quebec
 Montreal Aquarium (operated in 1966-1991)

New Brunswick
 Huntsman Marine Science Centre Aquarium/Sealab - St. Andrews

See also
List of aquaria

Canada
Aquaria
Aquaria